Mesocolpia is a genus of moths in the family Geometridae.

Species
Mesocolpia consobrina (Warren, 1901)
Mesocolpia dexiphyma (Prout, 1937)
Mesocolpia marmorata (Warren, 1899)
Mesocolpia nanula (Mabille, 1900)
Mesocolpia peremptata (Walker, 1862)
Mesocolpia protrusata (Warren, 1902)
Mesocolpia subcomosa Warren, 1901

Former species
Mesocolpia lita (Prout, 1916) was recently transferred to Pasiphila

References

Eupitheciini